Semenchevo is a rural locality (a village) in Kisnemskoye Rural Settlement, Vashkinsky District, Vologda Oblast, Russia. The population was 13 as of 2002.

Geography 
Semenchevo is located km 41 northwest of Lipin Bor (the district's administrative centre) by road. Gavrilovo-2 is the nearest rural locality.

References 

Rural localities in Vashkinsky District